Oninoborsk is a rural locality (a selo) situated in Khorinsky District, Republic of Buryatia, Russia. The population was 308 as of 2010. There are 6 streets.

Geography 
Oninoborsk is located 21 km northeast of Khorinsk (the district's administrative centre) by road. Bulum is the nearest rural locality.

References 

Rural localities in Khorinsky District